"Woman in Chains" is a song by English band Tears for Fears, released as the second single from their third studio album, The Seeds of Love (1989). It has been described as a "feminist anthem". It was an international success, reaching the top 40 in several countries, including the United Kingdom, the United States, Canada, France, and the Netherlands.

The studio cut features Phil Collins on drums. "Tears for Fears just wanted me to do that big drum thing from 'In the Air Tonight'..." Collins recalled. "'We want you to come in here in a big way.'" The song prominently features vocals by Oleta Adams, who went on to achieve a successful solo career. It was re-released in 1992 – with a different B-side and now credited to "Tears For Fears featuring Oleta Adams" – to capitalise on the singer's solo success and to promote the Tears for Fears compilation Tears Roll Down (Greatest Hits 82–92). This time, it reached number 57 in the UK.

Content
"Woman in Chains" was recorded as a duet. Orzabal explained the impetus for the lyric to Melody Maker: "I was reading some feminist literature at the time and I discovered that there are societies in the world still in existence today that are non-patriarchal. They don't have the man at the top and the women at the bottom. They're matricentric—they have the woman at the centre and these societies are a lot less violent, a lot less greedy and there's generally less animosity... but the song is also about how men traditionally play down the feminine side of their characters and how both men and women suffer for it.... I think men in a patriarchal society are sold down the river a bit—okay, maybe we're told that we're in control but there are also a hell of a lot of things that we miss out on, which women are allowed to be".

During a 2021 interview with the Louder website, when asked if the song is the feminist anthem it’s usually read as, Orzabal replied: "Um... it was really about my mother. At one point in her life she was a stripper. My father and she ran an entertainment agency from a council house in Portsmouth. So she would go out to strip, and my father would send a driver out with her to spy on her. If she talked to another man, when she came back he would beat her up. So it's about domestic abuse."

The song was sampled in the S.A.S. single "So Free" featuring Cam'ron and on Uneasy Listening Vol. 1 by DJ Z-Trip and DJ P. It also appears on the soundtrack of the 1993 film Boxing Helena.

Critical reception
David Giles from Music Week wrote, "The best track from the current LP, this starts out promising to be the portentous, pompous rock track that the right-on title suggests, but is rescued by the duo's intuitive pop touches. Watch out for some excellent guitar work."

Music video
The accompanying music video for "Woman in Chains", directed by Andy Morahan, was filmed in black and white. It focuses on the abusive relationship between a man (a boxer) and a woman (a pole-dancer, played by Angela Alvarado); interspersed with shots of the band and guest vocalist Oleta Adams performing the song. It also features Chris Hughes playing the drums.

Personnel 
 Roland Orzabal – vocals, keyboards, Fairlight programming, guitar
 Oleta Adams – vocals, keyboards
 Neil Taylor – guitar arpeggio
 Curt Smith – bass guitar
 Manu Katché (start to 3:32) and Phil Collins (from 3:32) – drums 
 Luís Jardim – percussion
 Tessa Niles – backing vocals
 Carol Kenyon – backing vocals

Charts

Weekly charts

Year-end charts

Release history

References

1989 songs
1989 singles
Black-and-white music videos
Fontana Records singles
Music videos directed by Andy Morahan
Songs written by Roland Orzabal
Tears for Fears songs